Jonas Karlsson (born February 14, 1986) is a Swedish ice hockey player. He is currently playing with Lindlövens IF of the Hockeyettan.

Karlsson has earlier played in the Swedish Hockey League with Örebro HK, during the 2013–14 SHL season.

References

External links

1986 births
Living people
Örebro HK players
Sparta Warriors players
Swedish ice hockey forwards
People from Kil Municipality
Sportspeople from Värmland County